Buena Vista County was a failed attempt to create a county from the territory of Tulare County, California, between 1855 and 1859.

IIIBUENA VISTA COUNTY

It was the predecessor of Kern County which was successfully organized in 1866.

References

Herbert G Comfort, Where Rolls the Kern, A History of Kern County, California, Enterprise Press, Moorepark, 1934, Chapter V, Buena Visa County

External links
  direct URL
  direct URL
  direct URL

Buena Vista County
History of Kern County, California
History of Los Angeles County, California
History of Tulare County, California